Pavel Chikida (born 21 June 1995) is a Belarusian professional footballer who plays for Maktaaral.

Honours
Gomel
Belarusian Cup winner: 2021–22

References

External links 
 
 

1995 births
Living people
Belarusian footballers
Association football midfielders
Belarusian expatriate footballers
Expatriate footballers in Kazakhstan
FC Torpedo-BelAZ Zhodino players
FC Krumkachy Minsk players
FC Smolevichi players
FC Dnyapro Mogilev players
FC Gomel players
FC Maktaaral players